Stowe-by-Chartley is a civil parish in the Borough of Stafford, Staffordshire, England.  It contains eight listed buildings that are recorded in the National Heritage List for England. Of these, two are at Grade II*, the middle of the three grades, and the others are at Grade II, the lowest grade.  The parish contains the villages of Stowe-by-Chartley and Drointon and the surrounding countryside.  Most of the listed buildings are farmhouses and cottages that are timber framed or have timber framed cores.  The other listed buildings are a church, a churchyard cross, and the ruins of a castle.


Key

Buildings

References

Citations

Sources

Lists of listed buildings in Staffordshire